Jefferson Park is a  park in the eponymous community area of Chicago, Illinois on the National Register of Historic Places.

Park features
The park is equipped with two baseball fields, one combination football/soccer field, three tennis courts, one playground and a spray pool and a full outdoor swimming pool with dressing facility. Each summer, hundreds of residents stroll the park grounds for "Jeff Fest," a Jefferson Park Chamber of Commerce-sponsored outdoor community festival featuring local food, vendors and bands. The all-volunteer Citywide Orchestra practices at Jefferson Park and performs seasonal concerts for the community.

History
Thomas Jefferson Memorial Park is named in honor of the drafter of the Declaration of Independence and third president of the United States Thomas Jefferson. The park was long referred to as simply Jefferson Park until the park received the memorial park designation in 1999 to distinguish it from a second park of the same name. This Jefferson Park was the creation of the Jefferson Park District, one of 22 park commissions consolidated into the Chicago Park District in 1934. The Jefferson Park District was established in 1920 to provide neighborhood parks for the rapidly developing northwest side of Chicago. Located on the site of the former Esdohr farm, land acquisition for the park began in 1921 and continued through 1929 when most of the park had been landscaped.

In 1930, the park district constructed an athletic field and a fieldhouse designed by Clarence Hatzfeld  whose architectural firm of Hatzfeld and Knox would later design many of the Prairie and Craftsman-style bungalows in the nearby Villa District by historic St. Wenceslaus Church. The brick fieldhouse is graced with several historic paintings, including an anonymous portrait of Thomas Jefferson, a depiction of a Viking ship replica by artist Emil Biorn, and Columbus Sighting Land by L. Caracciolo.

References

External links
Official Jefferson Park Historical Society website
Chicagoparkdistrict.com: Jefferson Park

Parks in Chicago
North Side, Chicago
Parks on the National Register of Historic Places in Chicago
1921 establishments in Illinois